The Party New Limburg (abbreviated as PNL), is a provincial political party in the Dutch province of Limburg. It has no parliamentary representation, but it is linked to the Independent Senate Group.

External links
Official web site

Regionalist parties in the Netherlands
Politics of Limburg (Netherlands)
Secessionist organizations in Europe